Ann Kirby (1770-1850) was a Canadian businesswoman. She managed a major trading company in Kingston, Ontario from 1800 until 1850, after the death of her husband. She was a leading public figure in Kingston, and was known as a philanthropist.

References 
 Jane Errington, "KIRBY, ANN," in Dictionary of Canadian Biography, vol. 7, University of Toronto/Université Laval, 2003–, accessed June 14, 2016, http://www.biographi.ca/en/bio/kirby_ann_7E.html.

1770 births
1850 deaths
19th-century businesswomen
19th-century Canadian businesspeople
Canadian women philanthropists